Lupe Wong Won't Dance, also published as Lupe Wong No Baila, is a middle-grade sports novel written by Donna Barba Higuera, illustrated by Mason London, translated to Spanish by Libia Brenda, and published September 8, 2020 by Levine Querido. The book is a Junior Library Guild selection, a Pura Belpré Award honor book, and PNBA Book Award winner.

Plot 
Guadalupe "Lupe" Wong is a half-Chinese, half-Mexican seventh grade student at Issaquah Middle School who dreams of becoming the first female pitcher in Major League Baseball. An opportunity arises for her to meet Fu Li Hernandez, “the first Asian/Latino pitcher in the major leagues,” if she receives straight A's in her classes. Everything goes well until she learns that she'll have to square dance in gym class to earn an A.

Reception 
Lupe Wong Won't Dance is a Junior Library Guild book. It received many positive reviews, including starred reviews from Booklist and Publishers Weekly.

Kirkus Reviews applauded the book's diversity in terms of character's interests and ethnicities and how Higuera was able to avoid "'diversity quota' pitfalls."

Selenia Paz, writing for Booklist, called Lupe Wong Won't Dance "[a] laugh-out-loud story about family, friendship, and the beauty in being true to yourself."

References 

2020 children's books